Rimantas Šulskis  (1943–1995) was a Lithuanian sculptor and painter.

See also
List of Lithuanian painters

References
This article was initially translated from the Lithuanian Wikipedia.

Lithuanian sculptors
1943 births
1995 deaths
20th-century sculptors
20th-century Lithuanian painters